Shakiso Airport  is an airport serving Shakiso in Ethiopia.

See also
Transport in Ethiopia

References                

 Great Circle Mapper - Shakiso
Google Earth

Airports in Ethiopia